Skeet was one of the thirteen shooting events at the 1992 Summer Olympics. It was the last Olympic skeet competition open to both men and women, and the only mixed shooting competition at the Olympics ever won by a woman: Zhang Shan. The competition consisted of a qualification round of 150 targets, a semifinal of 50 targets for the top 24 competitors, and a final of 25 targets for the top six. Hitting all 200 targets of the preliminary rounds, and 23 in the final, Zhang won ahead of four male shooters at 222. With José María Colorado eliminated due to lower final score, a three-way shoot-off between Juan Giha, Bruno Rossetti and Ioan Toman determined the silver and bronze medals, going to Giha and Rossetti respectively.  The event was held on 28 July at the Mollet del Vallès Shooting Range.

Qualification round

DNF Did not finish – Q Qualified for semifinal

Semifinal

OR Olympic record – Q Qualified for final

Final

OR Olympic record

References

Sources

Shooting at the 1992 Summer Olympics
1992 Skeet